Roads Not Taken: Tales of Alternate History is an anthology of alternate history short works edited by Gardner Dozois and Stanley Schmidt. It was first published in paperback by Del Rey/Ballantine in July 1998.

Summary
The book collects ten short stories by various authors, together with an introductory essay by Shelly Shapiro.

Contents
"What Is Alternate History?" [essay] (Shelly Shapiro)
"Must and Shall" (Harry Turtledove)
"An Outpost of the Empire" (Robert Silverberg)
"We Could Do Worse" (Gregory Benford)
"Over There" (Mike Resnick)
"Ink from the New Moon" (A. A. Attanasio)
"Southpaw" (Bruce McAllister)
"The West Is Red" (Greg Costikyan)
"The Forest of Time" (Michael Flynn)
"Aristotle and the Gun" (L. Sprague de Camp)
"How I Lost the Second World War and Helped Turn Back the German Invasion" (Gene Wolfe)

Notes

1998 anthologies
Alternate history anthologies
Gardner Dozois anthologies
Stanley Schmidt anthologies